Mary Gray Freeman (born October 30, 1933), also known by her former married name Mary Kelly, is an American former competition swimmer who represented the United States at the 1952 Summer Olympics in Helsinki, Finland.  Freeman competed in the preliminary heats of the women's 100-meter backstroke and recorded a time of 1:18.0.

Freeman married Olympic rowing bronze medalist John B. Kelly Jr., the brother of movie actress Grace Kelly, in 1954.  Freeman and Kelly had six children; they divorced in 1980.  She later married professor Alan Spitzer.

Mary Kelly went on to become a renowned swimming coach.  In the mid-1950s, she established one of the first all-women swim teams in the country, which she named Vesper Boat Club.  That name was the name of the rowing team in Philadelphia, Pennsylvania for which her husband Jack was competing. In 1958, Lyn Hopkins was Coach Kelly's first swimmer to place in the finals of the women's national championships—both for short course in Dallas, Texas and then for the long course championship in Topeka, Kansas.  Other Vesper Boat Club swimmers, including Ellie Daniel, Susan Doerr, Nina Harmer and Martha Randall, quickly began to compete at the national level. By 1960, half a dozen of her team members swam at the U.S. Olympic Trials, with two being selected to compete at the 1960 Summer Olympics in Rome.

In August 1961, the Vesper Boat Club won the National Championships in Philadelphia, Pennsylvania.  Altogether, Freeman sent five women on to represent the United States in the Olympic Games.  She also went on to coach the University of Pennsylvania's women's swim team.

She would have been the first woman to be an Olympic swimming coach for the United States in 1964, but took her name off the list because it was not important to her at the time.  In her short coaching career, she inspired many women, including over a dozen of her own swimmers, to go into coaching.

Freeman was inducted into the International Swimming Hall of Fame for her coaching accomplishments in 1988.

References

1933 births
Living people
American female backstroke swimmers
Olympic swimmers of the United States
Sportspeople from Bangor, Maine
Swimmers at the 1952 Summer Olympics
Kelly family